Anthony David Hobson (born 10 September 1965) is a former English cricketer.  Hobson was a right-handed batsman who bowled right-arm off break.  He was born in Eccleshall, Staffordshire.

Hobson made his debut for Staffordshire in the 1989 Minor Counties Championship against Durham.  Hobson played Minor counties cricket for Staffordshire from 1989 to 1994, which included 22 Minor Counties Championship matches and 5 MCCA Knockout Trophy matches.  He made his only List A appearance for Staffordshire against Warwickshire in the 1992 NatWest Trophy.  He was dismissed for a duck in this match by Allan Donald.

References

External links
Anthony Hobson at ESPNcricinfo
Anthony Hobson at CricketArchive

1965 births
Living people
People from the Borough of Stafford
English cricketers
Staffordshire cricketers